Kiyama (written: 木山 meaning "tree mountain" or 喜山) is a Japanese surname. Notable people with the surname include:

, Japanese sinologist
, Japanese footballer
, Japanese footballer and manager

Japanese-language surnames